William Jourdan Rapp (June 17, 1895 - 1942) was a writer and editor in the United States. He wrote plays, novels, and radio scripts. He edited True Story magazine. 

Rapp was born in New York City. He graduated from Cornell in 1917 and worked as a health inspector in New York City until World War I. He served in France. After the war he also worked in Turkey.

He kept a scrapbook during his time at a YMCA camp in Greece. He went on to edit the popular True Story magazine and various radio series. In 1925 he wrote a piece in the New York Times about French Royalists.

He wrote with  Wallace Thurman, Hughes Allison, and Lowell Brentano.

He married actress Virginia Venable Rapp and had a son and daughter.

Plays
Osman Pasha
Whirlpool (1929)
 Hilda Cassidy
 Substitute for Murder
Holmses of Baker Street
Harlem: A Melodrama of Negro life in Harlem written with Wallace Thurman, adapting Thurman's first novel The Blacker the Berry to the stage
Jeremiah the Magnificent written with Wallace Thurman about Marcus Garvey and "Black Mecca"

Books
When I Was a Boy in Turkey
 Looking Down from Olympus
Poolroom

References

External links
Findagrave entry

American male dramatists and playwrights
20th-century American dramatists and playwrights

1895 births
1942 deaths